The Minister for Sport (Italian: Ministro per lo Sport) in Italy is one of the positions in the Italian government.

The current minister is Andrea Abodi, an independent, who held the office since 22 October 2022.

List of Ministers
 Parties

 Governments

References

Sport